Paul Vigouroux (1919–1980), also known as Mathieu Laurier, was a French political activist and anti-communist. He was a member of the Jeunesses Patriotes, La Cagoule, and was secretary general of the Parti français national-collectiviste (PFNC), a political party that was one of the forerunners of the Legion of French Volunteers Against Bolshevism.

After the French Occupation by Germany in 1941, he volunteered to fight against the USSR in the Eastern Front with the Legion of French Volunteers. In 1942 he joined Franc-Garde, the armed wing of the paramilitary force Milice. He also edited Au Pilori, an anti-Semitic newspaper.

After the Liberation of France he fled to Venezuela, where he wrote his memoirs under the pseudonym Mathieu Laurier.

References
 Il reste le drapeau noir et les copains, publisher Regain - Monte-Carlo 1953 (republished by L'Homme libre, 2002)

1919 births
1980 deaths
20th-century French non-fiction writers
French anti-communists
French military personnel of World War II
French collaborators with Nazi Germany
French male writers
20th-century French male writers